John Steward (October 21, 1807 – May 2, 1885) was an American politician in the 19th Century. He was elected to represent Chautauqua County in the New York State Assembly from the Republican Party.

Steward served in the 87th State Assembly, from 1863 to 1864, during the Civil War, when he resided in Panama, New York.

Family

His father was John Steward (1786-1826), and his mother was Eunice Wilcox (1787-1875). He married Johanna Glidden (1808-1896). They had five children, of which they had two sets of twins: Franklin G. Steward (1833-1908), Francis C. Steward (1833-1896), Henry C. Steward (1841-1892), Mary E. Steward (1846-1920), and Martha A. Steward (1846-1901)

References

Other sources
 US and NY census
 Greenwood Cemetery, Panama, Chautauqua Co, NY grave records

1807 births
1885 deaths
Republican Party members of the New York State Assembly
People from Harmony, New York
19th-century American politicians